is a Japanese professional golfer. Hagawa is a left-handed golfer.

Hagawa played on the Japan Golf Tour, winning five times. He was invited to the Masters Tournament twice, finishing T-15 in his first performance in 1982.

Professional wins (9)

Japan Golf Tour wins (5)

Other wins (1)
1995 Kanto Open

Japan PGA Senior Tour wins (3)
2011 Total Energy Cup PGA Philanthropy Senior Tournament
2013 Fancl Classic
2014 Fancl Classic

External links

Japanese male golfers
Japan Golf Tour golfers
Left-handed golfers
Sportspeople from Tochigi Prefecture
1957 births
Living people
20th-century Japanese people
21st-century Japanese people